Anoplognathus smaragdinus is a beetle of the family Scarabaeidae native to Queensland, Australia.

References

Scarabaeidae
Beetles described in 1818